The 1999–2000 Botola is the 44th season of the Moroccan Premier League. Raja Casablanca are the holders of the title.

References

Morocco 1999–2000

Botola seasons
Morocco
Botola